The Jungle Party (also translated Forest Party) was a secessionist party active in northern Iran during 1940s. The party was founded by armed rebels and some of Mirza Kuchik Khan's old associates who tried to revive the Persian Socialist Soviet Republic created in 1921 and used its red flag as a symbol.
It allied with the Iran Party, Tudeh Party of Iran, Democratic Party of Iranian Kurdistan and Azerbaijani Democratic Party in 1946.

See also 
 Jungle Movement of Gilan

References

1941 establishments in Iran
1947 disestablishments in Iran
Defunct nationalist parties
Defunct socialist parties in Iran
Iranian nationalism
Nationalist parties in Iran
Political parties disestablished in 1947
Political parties established in 1941
Political parties in Pahlavi Iran (1941–1979)